This is a list of jungle and drum and bass artists/DJs. This includes notable artists who have either been very important to the genre or have had a considerable amount of exposure (such as those who have been on a major label). This list does not include little-known local artists. Artists are listed by the first letter of their pseudonym (not including the words "a", "an", or "the"), and individuals are listed by last name.



0–9
 1991
 4hero

A
 AK1200
 Adam F
Alix Perez
 Amon Tobin
 Andy C
 Aphex Twin
 Aphrodite
 Aquasky
 Audio

B
 B-Complex
 Bachelors of Science
 Bad Company
 Billain
 Black Sun Empire
 Blame (music producer)
 Blu Mar Ten
 Blanke
 Blue Stahli
 Michiel van den Bos
 Boymerang
 Breakbeat Era
 Justin Broadrick
 Brookes Brothers
 Danny Byrd

C
Calibre
 Calyx
 Camo & Krooked
 Davide Carbone
 Cause 4 Concern
 Celldweller
 Chase & Status
 Commix
 Concord Dawn
 Corrupt Souls
 Counterstrike
 Crissy Criss
 Culture Shock
 Current Value

D
 D.Kay
 DBridge
 DC Breaks
 Dimension
 DJ Craze
 DJ Dara
 DJ Dextrous
 DJ Die
 DJ Food
 DJ Fresh
 DJ Friction
 DJ Hazard
 DJ Hidden
 DJ Hype
 DJ Kentaro
 DJ Marky
 DJ Patife
 DJ Rap
 DJ Ron
 DJ SS
 DJ Starscream
 DJ Zinc
 Danny Breaks
 Decoder
 DeeJay Delta
 Deekline
 Delta Heavy
 Demon Boyz
 Dieselboy
 Dillinja
 Dirtyphonics
 Doc Scott
 Dom & Roland
 Doubleclick
 Drumagick
 Drumsound & Bassline Smith
 Dwarf Electro

E
 E-Z Rollers
 Eresse
 Etherwood
 Evol Intent
 Tim Exile
 Eye-D

F
 Fabio
 The Flashbulb
 Fox Stevenson
 Freaky Flow
 Fred V & Grafix

G
 Getafix 
 Goldie
 Grooverider
 A Guy Called Gerald
 Gremlinz

H
 High Contrast
 Hybrid

I
 Ill.Skillz
 Ilk
 Imanu
 Isometrik

J
 Jade
 J Majik
 John B
 Jonny L
 Jordana
 Jumping Jack Frost

K
 Keeno
 Ray Keith
 Kevens
 Kemistry
 Kemistry & Storm
 Kenny Ken
 Kill the Noise
 Killbot
 Klute
 Konflict
 Kosheen
 Kove
 Koven
 Krust
 Kuuro

L
 LTJ Bukem
 Lamb
 Left Spine Down
 Lenzman
 Limewax
 Liondub
 LiveSummit
 Loadstar
 Logistics
 London Elektricity (also released as Peter Nice Trio)
 Luude

M
 Maduk
 Makoto
 Marcus Intalex
 Matrix
 Metrik
 Michele Sainte
 Missrepresent
 Muzz

N
 Nanotek
 Nerve
 Netsky
 Noisia
 Nucleus
 Nu:Logic
 Nu:Tone

O
 Omni Trio
 Optical

P
 PH10
 The Panacea
 Panda
 Paradox
 Pendulum
 Peshay
 Phace
 Photek
 Plastikman
 Plug
 Podočnjaci
 Polar
 Pythius (producer)
 The Prodigy
 The Prototypes

Q
 Q Project
 The Qemists
 Quoit

R
 Rabbit Junk
 Ragga Twins
 Ram Trilogy
 Rawtekk
 Rebel MC
 Red Snapper
 Alex Reece
 Renegade Soundwave
 Replicator
 Reprazent
 Roni Size
 Rregula
 Rudimental
 Ed Rush

S
 Michele Sainte
 S9
 Salmonella Dub
 Seba
 Shapeshifter
 Shimon
 The Shizit
 ShockOne
 Shy FX
 Si Begg
 Sigma
 Skibadee
 Slipmatt
 Ed Solo
 Source Direct
 Spectrum
 Spor
 Spring Heel Jack
 Squarepusher
 Stamina MC
 Stanton Warriors
 State of Mind
 Step 13
 Fox Stevenson
 Stevie Hyper D
 Sub Focus
 Submerged
 System 7

T
 T Power
 TC
 The Glitch Mob 
 Tiki Taane
 Tabla Beat Science
 Nobukazu Takemura
 Teebee
 Soichi Terada
 Total Science
 Typecell

U
 U-ziq

 Ulterior Motive

V
 Vector Burn
 Venetian Snares
 Luke Vibert

W
 Wagon Christ
 Danny Wheeler
 Wickaman
 Wilkinson
 Witchman

X
 XRS
 Xample

Z
 Zardonic

References

 
Jungle